Live at Austin City Limits is a DVD and CD released by Image Entertainment in 2003 and 2001, respectively. The set captures a live performance by singer Roy Orbison on August 5, 1982 from the PBS television show Austin City Limits. Orbison was the first "legend" to appear on the weekly series, which, at the time, featured local Texas performers. It is said that Orbison's appearance on the show paved the way for other legends such as Ray Charles, Marty Robbins, and even Johnny Cash to appear on the series.  Unfortunately, Orbison was recovering from recent triple bypass heart surgery and also had a head cold on the day so his voice was not as strong as it was usually.

Running time: 60 minutes

Track listing
 "Only the Lonely"
 "Leah"
 "Dream Baby"
 "In Dreams"
 "Mean Woman Blues"
 "Blue Angel"
 "Lana"
 "Blue Bayou"
 "Candy Man"
 "Crying"
 "Crying" (reprise)
 "Ooby Dooby"
 "Hound Dog Man"
 one of the few times he performed this 1979 tribute to his friend Elvis Presley
 "Working for the Man"
 "That Lovin' You Feelin' Again" (Grammy winning duet from 1980) 
 "Go Go Go (Down the Line)"
 "It's Over"
 "Oh, Pretty Woman"
 "Running Scared"
 "Running Scared" (reprise)

Television soundtracks
Roy Orbison video albums
Roy Orbison albums
Live video albums
2003 video albums
2003 live albums
2001 live albums
2001 soundtrack albums